Lamda may refer to:
 Lambda, a Greek letter
 LAMDA, the London Academy of Music and Dramatic Art
 LaMDA, a group of neural language models

See also 
 Lambda (disambiguation)